Vasilije Vučetić (born 4 May 1996) is a Serbian professional basketball player who plays for Força Lleida of the LEB Oro. He is a 2.08 m tall center who can also play the power forward position.

He joined CB Peñas Huesca in 2019. Vučetić averaged 14 points and 5.5 rebounds per game. He signed with Krka on 31 August 2020.

References

External links
 Union Olimpija Profile
 Eurobasket.com profile
 FIBA Profile
 Federación Española de Baloncesto Profile

1996 births
Living people
ABA League players
Basketball League of Serbia players
Bilbao Basket players
Centers (basketball)
KK Krka players
KK Olimpija players
KK Vojvodina players
Força Lleida CE players
Liga ACB players
Power forwards (basketball)
Serbian expatriate basketball people in Slovenia
Serbian expatriate basketball people in Spain
Serbian men's basketball players
People from Vrbas, Serbia